Vicente Aguilar Carmona (born 10 April 1970 in Valencia) is a five-a-side football player from Spain.  He has a disability: he is blind.  He played five-a-side football at the 2004 Summer Paralympics.  His team finished third after they played Greece and, won 2–0.

He was a member of the national team in 2013 and competed in the European Championships.

References 

Living people
1970 births
5-a-side footballers at the 2004 Summer Paralympics
People from Valencia
Paralympic bronze medalists for Spain
Paralympic 5-a-side footballers of Spain
Medalists at the 2004 Summer Paralympics
Paralympic medalists in football 5-a-side